Bryllupsfesten is a 1989 Norwegian comedy film written by Petter Vennerød, and directed by Vennerød and Svend Wam, starring Knut Husebø and Eli Anne Linnestad. Businessman Carl Otto "Totto" Holm (Husebø) is on the verge of bankruptcy, and plans a staged robbery of the family's Munch engraving.

External links
 
 Bryllupsfesten at Filmweb.no (Norwegian)
 Bryllupsfesten at the Norwegian Film Institute (Norwegian)

1989 films
1989 comedy films
Films directed by Svend Wam
Films directed by Petter Vennerød
Norwegian comedy films
Films set in Oslo